Fayette Historic State Park is the state park of the historic town of Fayette in the U.S. state of Michigan. It is located on the Big Bay de Noc of Lake Michigan, between Snail Shell Harbor and Sand Bay, on the southern side of the Upper Peninsula, about 17 miles south of US 2. Fayette was the site of an industrial community that manufactured charcoal pig iron between 1867 and 1891. The town has been reconstructed into a living museum, showing what life was like in this town in the late 19th century. It was listed on the National Register of Historic Places in 1970.

History
Fayette was once one of the Upper Peninsula's most productive iron-smelting operations.  Fayette grew up around two blast furnaces, a large dock, and several charcoal kilns, following the post-Civil War need for iron.  Nearly 500 residents—many immigrating from Canada, the British Isles, and northern Europe—lived in and near the town that existed to make pig iron.  During 24 years of operation Fayette's blast furnaces produced a total of 229,288 tons of iron, using local hardwood forests for fuel and quarrying limestone from the bluffs to purify the iron ore.  When the charcoal iron market began to decline, the Jackson Iron Company closed its Fayette smelting operations in 1891.  Another event leading to the demise of the Jackson Iron Company was the use of the hardwoods and limestone to purify the iron, leading to the exhaustion of hardwoods in the area.  This was the main source for purifying the iron and therefore led to the decline of the Jackson Iron Company.  After shutting down operations, many residents left Fayette in search of employment elsewhere, though some chose to stay nearby and used the land for farming.

Because of the closing of smelting operations, the town became a resort and fishing village. In 1916 it was purchased by a wealthy individual and turned into a summer resort. It continued in that capacity until 1946 when another individual purchased it, who eventually fell behind on taxes. Lastly, it was purchased by the Escanaba Paper Company, and was swapped to the Michigan government for timberland. As a result, Fayette became a state park in 1959.

Fayette Historic Townsite
Today, Fayette Historic Townsite is a living museum with many restored buildings.  Visitors may walk through the buildings to learn about life in Fayette during the late 19th century.  Over 20 buildings are open, with restoration continuing on other parts of the town.

The townsite is open daily for visitors from approx. May through October.  A visitors center and museum store are also located at the park.  There is no admission charge; however, a Michigan State Park permit is required.

Camping
There are 61 semi-modern campsites .  Facilities include electrical service to all campsites and access to vault toilets and water.  Most campsites are well shaded.  Boat camping is allowed in Snail Shell Harbor, and space is on a first-come, first-served basis.
There is a beach on Sand Bay (Lake Michigan) just a short distance from the campground. The picnic area is adjacent to the beach and offers a picnic shelter, grills and vault toilets.  Playground equipment and horseshoe courts are available.

Hiking 
The trails are groomed in the winter for cross-country skiing. Trails wind through a hardwood forest, up beside dolomite cliffs (which are part of the Niagara Escarpment) and throughout the historic townsite.

Climate

See also 
 Spider Cave: an archaeological site within the park.

References

External links

Fayette Historic State Park Michigan Department of Natural Resources
Fayette Historic State Park Map Michigan Department of Natural Resources
Fayette Historic Townsite Map Michigan History Center
 

Ironworks and steel mills in the United States
1867 establishments in Michigan
Living museums in Michigan
Michigan State Historic Sites
State parks of Michigan
Museums in Delta County, Michigan
Parks on the National Register of Historic Places in Michigan
Open-air museums in Michigan
Protected areas of Delta County, Michigan
Protected areas established in 1959
National Register of Historic Places in Delta County, Michigan